Stanley Fink (February 6, 1936 – March 4, 1997) was an American lawyer and politician.

Life
Fink was born on February 6, 1936, in Brooklyn, New York City. He attended New Utrecht High School. He graduated from Brooklyn College in 1956, and from New York University School of Law in 1959. He then joined the U.S. Air Force, serving in England as a second lieutenant with the Judge Advocate General's office. He was discharged in 1962 as a captain. He returned to Brooklyn, where he practiced law and entered politics as a Democrat. He married Judith, and they had two sons: Marcus Fink and Keith Fink.

In 1968, Fink was appointed as chief counsel to the Assembly's Committee on Mental Hygiene. He was a  member of the New York State Assembly from 1969 to 1986, sitting in the 178th, 179th, 180th, 181st, 182nd, 183rd, 184th, 185th and 186th New York State Legislatures. He was Majority Leader in 1977 and 1978; and Speaker from 1979 to 1986.

In 1986, he decided not to seek re-election, saying he wanted to spend more time with his family and earn more money in the private sector. He joined Bower & Gardner, a Manhattan law firm, and was senior vice president for regulatory and Government affairs for NYNEX at the time of his death.

He died on March 4, 1997, in Massachusetts General Hospital in Boston, Massachusetts, of heart failure. He had been in failing health since late January when he underwent surgery for a recurrence of cancer. He was buried at the Mt. Ararat Cemetery on Long Island.

Sources
Stanley Fink, Assembly Speaker, 61, Is Dead in the New York Times on March 6, 1997

1936 births
1997 deaths
Speakers of the New York State Assembly
Democratic Party members of the New York State Assembly
Brooklyn College alumni
New York University School of Law alumni
Jewish American state legislators in New York (state)
Politicians from Brooklyn
United States Air Force officers
20th-century American politicians
New Utrecht High School alumni
20th-century American Jews